Sufczyn  is a village in the administrative district of Gmina Dębno, within Brzesko County, Lesser Poland Voivodeship, in southern Poland.

The village has an approximate population of 2,000.

References

Sufczyn